Sunne Municipality is a municipality in Värmland County in west central Sweden. Its seat is located in the town of Sunne.

The present municipality was created in 1971 when the market town (köping) Sunne (instituted in 1920) was amalgamated with Gräsmark and Lysvik.

Localities
Lysvik
Mårbacka
Rottneros
Sunne (seat)
Uddheden
Västra Ämtervik

Karlstad, which has an international airport, is the nearest large city.

References

External links

Brobytornet - Project site

Municipalities of Värmland County